The Howard Street Tunnel fire (also known as the Baltimore Freight Rail Crash) was a 60-car CSX Transportation freight train derailment that occurred in the Howard Street Tunnel, a freight through-route tunnel under Howard Street in Baltimore, Maryland, on July 18, 2001.  The derailment sparked a chemical fire that raged for five or six days and virtually shut down the downtown area. In the evening of the first day, a water main ruptured causing significant flooding in the streets above. The accident disrupted Northeast Corridor rail service. It also slowed Internet service in the US for several hours due to the destruction of a cable passing through the tunnel.

The derailment and fire
The train consisted of 60 cars. Cars 46 through 56 derailed in the Howard Street Tunnel at 3:08 PM, and became disconnected from the first 45 cars. The train experienced an automatic emergency brake application resulting from the separation of the train, but the crew didn't realise that a derailment had taken place. Around 3:26 they moved the locomotives out of the tunnel.

Around 4 PM smoke was seen coming from a sewer near the intersection of Howard and Lombard Streets, and the fire department was notified. Later, smoke emerged from the ends of the tunnel and from several manholes. Eventually it was found that one of the derailed tank cars, carrying tripropylene, had ruptured and the escaping flammable liquid had caught fire. This fire also ignited paper and wood products in other cars. Another tank car ruptured releasing  of hydrochloric acid. The fire burned for about 5 days.

A National Transportation Safety Board report took three years to be prepared. The investigation was not able to find the cause of the accident.

A numerical simulation by the National Institute of Standards and Technology found that the peak calculated temperatures within the tunnel were approximately  within the flaming regions, and on average approximately  when averaged over a length of the tunnel equal to three to four rail car lengths. Due to the insulation of the tunnel's thick brick walls, the temperature was relatively uniform across all the cars, approaching temperatures normally found in an oven or furnace: The peak wall surface temperature reached about  where the flames were directly impinging, and on average  over the length of three to four rail cars.

Impact on Baltimore downtown region

Thousands of Baltimore workers were forced to leave their jobs and unable to come back for several days until the city could assure that there was no further danger from either the fire or the water main flooding. The crash also impacted MARC passenger train service for several days; bus routes were set up by the city to ferry passengers to and from the BWI Amtrak/MARC station as an alternate route. MARC service was restored on July 23, 2001.

Most of the roads around Howard Street, including I-395 spur into Baltimore, experienced extremely heavy congestion due to street closures around the intersection of Howard and Lombard Streets, where the actual water main break occurred. By July 24, 2001, all but the blocks immediately surrounding the water main break were reopened to automotive traffic.

Three weeks later, manhole covers flew into the air as underground explosions along West Pratt Street occurred due to residual explosive chemicals from the fire in the sewers.

Smoke from the incident and flooding from the broken water main caused three Baltimore Orioles baseball home games to be canceled that summer, as Oriole Park at Camden Yards was directly in the danger zone caused by the fire.

Impact on East Coast rail traffic

The Howard Street Tunnel is on the only direct rail link on the CSX rail line from Philadelphia to Washington, D.C. The only other direct rail link is the Amtrak Northeast Corridor, a passenger line with only limited freight operations performed by Norfolk Southern Railway. According to the U.S. Department of Transportation (DOT) report on the incident, officials had long known that the possibility existed for a fire or other disaster to cause a significant problem in the Howard Street Tunnel.  An article published in the Baltimore Sun on July 19, 2001, contains a 1985 quote from an unidentified federal transportation safety official who observed, "... the problem would be getting in there to fight the fire... If you had an explosion, fire would shoot out of both ends like a bazooka."  However, freight traffic on the line had been increasing for years as CSX and Conrail diverted traffic away from Amtrak lines to avoid Amtrak/Conrail crashes like the one in Chase, Maryland in 1987. Estimates from railway publications put the freight traffic through the Howard Street Tunnel at 28 to 32 trains per day.

According to a November 2005 report to Congress:
The tunnel closing caused major disruption to CSXT freight traffic, Maryland Rail Commuter (MARC) commuter trains, and to Central Light Rail Line trains and bus lines that traversed Howard Street. To avoid the Howard Street Tunnel, CSXT had to send freight trains west to Cleveland, north to Albany, New York, and then south to Baltimore, incurring a three- to four-day delay. Some CSXT trains were rerouted via the busy NS line through Manassas, Virginia, Hagerstown, Maryland, and Harrisburg, Pennsylvania.
At one point during the fire, eight CSXT trains that would have used the tunnel were detouring through Cumberland, Maryland, and Youngstown Ohio; five through Hagerstown and Harrisburg; five through Cleveland and Albany, New York; and 12 trains were stopping in various yards.

According to the DOT report on the incident, firefighting efforts could not begin until the exact location of the fire within the tunnel could be found, which finally occurred at 5:00 a.m. (Eastern Daylight Time, 10:00 UTC) on July 19, 2001. Work on repairing the break in the water main enabled the firemen to find a manhole cover on Howard Street through which they could gain access to both the broken water main and the tunnel itself, and firefighting efforts began in earnest. Three rail cars (boxcars of paper and plywood) were removed from the tunnel and their flaming contents were extinguished the morning of July 22, 2001. Once the water main break was finally stopped on the same day, tunnel inspectors could enter the area. Amazingly, there were no significant structural damages, and the tunnel was officially reopened to traffic at 7:45 a.m. on July 23, 2001.

Impact on other services
Beyond the adverse effects on railroad traffic, there was a massive effect on life and activities in downtown Baltimore. The incident forced the closing of streets and business over much of downtown for several days. 

According to a November 2005 Report to Congress
 Officials cancelled three Baltimore Orioles games, resulting in a $5 million loss to the team.
 They also closed Howard Street, along with 14 other cross streets, for five days.
 A two-block stretch of Howard Street remained closed for six more weeks.
 MTA Maryland rerouted 23 bus lines, and MARC Train service to Camden Station was suspended.
 The fire and burst water main damaged power cables and left 1,200 Baltimore buildings without electricity.
 Severed fiber-optic lines backed up traffic regionally and nationally because the fiber-optic cable through the tunnel is a major line for the extremely busy Northeast Corridor.
 The Inner Harbor was closed to boat traffic.
 A water-main break near the tunnel added to the chaos, causing the collapse of part of a major thoroughfare and power outages.

The severed optical fiber cable in the tunnel was a major east coast internet communication link belonging to WorldCom. The break slowed internet service around the US for several hours; water from the water main break caused further damage to the communication lines. According to the DoT report, WorldCom was able to install a fully redundant network bypass around the incident within 36 hours, allowing resumption of east coast and transatlantic internet communications.

The aftermath of the fire affected some activities for longer periods. 
 MTA shut down light rail service through the city for over seven weeks, with shuttle buses running between the North Avenue and Patapsco stations, and later between North Avenue and Camden.
 The intersection at Howard and Lombard streets, one of the busiest in the city, was not re-opened until September 5.

See also 
 Summit Tunnel fire a similar incident in the UK involving a freight train carrying petrol derailing and catching fire in a tunnel.
 List of rail accidents (2000–2009)

References

External links 
 NTSB report
 NIST numerical simulation of the fire
 Effects of Catastrophic Events on Transportation System Management and Operations – DOT report
 FRA Report To Congress: Baltimore's Railroad Network, Challenges and Alternatives, November 2005
 Part 1: Challenges, discussing the history and recent state of Baltimore rail infrastructure.
 Part 2: Alternatives , discussing possible new tunnel alignments.

Railway accidents in 2001
Railway accidents and incidents in Maryland
2001 in Maryland
Derailments in the United States
Rail crash
Accidents and incidents involving CSX Transportation
Fires in Maryland
Train and rapid transit fires
Tunnel fires
Chimney effect fires
2001 fires in the United States
July 2001 events in the United States